This is a list of Canadian One-day International cricketers. A One Day International, or an ODI, is an international cricket match between two representative teams, each having ODI status, as determined by the International Cricket Council (ICC). An ODI differs from Test matches in that the number of overs per team is limited, and that each team has only one innings. The list is arranged in the order in which each player won his first ODI cap. Where more than one player won his first ODI cap in the same match, those players are listed alphabetically by surname.

Key

Players
Statistics are correct as of the Canada's most recent ODI, against the Netherlands on 28 January 2014.

Notes

See also
One Day International
Canadian cricket team
Canadian national cricket captains
List of Canada Twenty20 International cricketers

References

External links
Howstat
Cricinfo

Canada ODI
ODI